The Teng Yun (“Cloud Rider”) is a UAV under development by the National Chung-Shan Institute of Science and Technology  (NCSIST) of Taiwan. It was said to be able to carry armaments to conduct combat missions.

Overview

The Teng Yun is a medium UCAV with a resemblance to the American MQ-9 Reaper. The 2019 defense budget allocated funds to build a significant number of Teng Yun systems.

Development
A prototype was exhibited at the Taipei Aerospace & Defense Technology Exhibition in 2015. An updated model with underwing hard points was exhibited in 2017.

In 2018 a Teng Yun being tested was observed by residents of Taitung. Taiwan’s Air Force declined to procure the platform over concerns about the reliability of its electronic systems. In response NCSIST introduced an improved model with enhanced thrust, greater-range, more payloads, an enhanced flight control system, and a triple-backup power system. NCSIST has announced that the improved the version of the Teng Yun would commence testing in Jan. 2020 with combat testing to be conducted in 2021. Pictures of the improved version first surfaced in 2020. The improved version has a wider fuselage, a larger air intake, and more closely resembles the MQ-9 Reaper. In June 2022 one of the improved variants, dubbed the Teng Yun 2, completed a ten hour test flight.

Incidents
In February 2021 one prototype of the first generation Teng Yun crashed in Taitung Forest Park during a test flight.

General characteristics 
 Primary Function: reconnaissance and strike UAV
 Power Plant: turboprop 
 Range: >1,000km
 Endurance: 24 hours
 Ceiling: 25,000 feet

See also
CAIG Wing Loong
DRDO Rustom
EADS Harfang
General Atomics MQ-9 Reaper 
IAI Heron
TAI Anka

References

Military equipment of the Republic of China
Unmanned aerial vehicles of Taiwan
Medium-altitude long-endurance unmanned aerial vehicles
Single-engined pusher aircraft